The Basketball Federation of Moldova is the governing body of basketball in Moldova. It was founded in 1991, and are headquartered in Chișinău.

The Basketball Federation of Moldova operates the Moldova men's national team and Moldova women's national team. They organize national competitions in Moldova, for both the men's and women's senior teams and also the youth national basketball teams.

The top professional league in Moldova is the Moldovan National Division.

See also
Moldova men's national basketball team
Moldova men's national under-20 basketball team
Moldova men's national under-18 basketball team
Moldova men's national under-16 basketball team
Moldova women's national basketball team
Moldova women's national under-18 basketball team
Moldova women's national under-16 basketball team

References

External links
Official website
Moldova at FIBA site

Basketball
Fed
Basketball governing bodies in Europe
Sports organizations established in 1991
Sport in Chișinău